Dan Mazier  (born 1963 or 1964) is a Canadian politician who was elected to represent the riding of Dauphin—Swan River—Neepawa in the House of Commons of Canada in the 2019 Canadian federal election.  He was previously the president of Keystone Agricultural Producers.

Background
In 2018 Mazier stepped down as President of Manitoba's largest general farm organization, Keystone Agricultural Produces (KAP), to seek the federal nomination for the Conservative Party of Canada in the constituency of Dauphin-Swan River-Neepawa. He successfully became the party's candidate and went on to win a seat in the House of Commons in the 2019 election with the largest number of votes in the constituency's history.

Mazier's victory was attributed to his focus on rural Canada and focusing on policies that impacted rural Canadians most. This included his focus on improving rural connectivity with better internet and cell phone service and supporting seniors and families living on fixed-incomes.

43rd Parliament 
After being sworn in to office, Mazier was named as the Deputy Shadow Minister for Environment and Climate Change by then leader, Andrew Scheer. Mazier focused on bringing a rural lens to environmental policy and strongly opposed a one-size-fits-all approach that he claimed disproportionally impacted rural Canadians. This included his strong opposition to Justin Trudeau's carbon tax and his support for environmental policies that empowered farmers, ranchers, and landowners to participate in ecological goods and services programs.

In 2020, Mazier was appointed to sit on the Standing Committee on Fisheries and Oceans by newly elected leader, Erin O'Toole.

Bill C-299 (An Act to Amend the Telecommunications Act) 
In 2021, Mazier made national headlines when he introduced his Private Members Bill, C-299 (An Act to Amend the Telecommunications Act) in Parliament. Bill C-299 was spearheaded by Mazier to tackle misleading speed claims by Canadian internet companies. His legislation received much support from high-profile advocacy organizations who agreed with his notion that too many Canadians in rural Canada were paying ridiculously high prices for speeds that were no where near what consumers signed up for.

Mazier also spent his time in the 43rd Parliament focusing on addressing rural crime. He stated that too many Canadians in rural regions are taken advantage of by criminals because of the well-known lack of response time for emergency services. In spring of 2021 his constituents supported his work on this file when he seconded Bill C-289 in the House of Commons. Bill C-289 would have amended the Criminal Code to toughen measures for criminals who victimize rural Canadians by creating an aggravating factor at sentencing for targeting people and property that are vulnerable due to remoteness from emergency medical or police service.

Electoral record

References

External links

Living people
Conservative Party of Canada MPs
Members of the House of Commons of Canada from Manitoba
Year of birth uncertain
People from Westman Region, Manitoba
Year of birth missing (living people)